Frank Morgan (December 23, 1933 – December 14, 2007) was a jazz saxophonist with a career spanning more than 50 years.  He mainly played alto saxophone but also played soprano saxophone. He was known as a Charlie Parker successor who primarily played bebop and ballads.

Biography

Early life (1933–1947)
Frank Morgan was born in Minneapolis, Minnesota in 1933, but spent most of his childhood living with his grandmother in Milwaukee, Wisconsin while his parents were on tour.  Morgan's father Stanley was a guitarist with Harlan Leonard and the Rockets and The Ink Spots, and his mother, Geraldine, was a 14-year-old student when she gave birth to him.  Morgan took up his father's instrument at an early age, but lost interest the moment he saw Charlie Parker take his first solo with the Jay McShann band at the Paradise Theater in Detroit, Michigan. Stanley introduced them backstage, where Parker offered Morgan advice about starting out on the alto sax, and they met at a music store the following day.  Morgan, seven years old at the time, assumed they'd be picking out a saxophone, but Parker suggested he start on the clarinet to develop his embouchure. Morgan practiced on the clarinet for about two years before acquiring a soprano sax, and finally, an alto. Morgan moved to live with his father (by that time divorced) in Los Angeles, California at the age of 14, after his grandmother caught him with marijuana.

Los Angeles (1947–1955)
As a teenager Morgan had opportunities to jam with the likes of Dexter Gordon and Wardell Gray on Sunday afternoons at the Crystal Tearoom.  When he was just 15 years old, Morgan was offered Johnny Hodges's spot in Duke Ellington's Orchestra, but Stanley deemed him too young for touring.  Instead he joined the house band at Club Alabam where he backed vocalists including Billie Holiday and Josephine Baker.  That same year he won a television talent-show contest, the prize of which was a recording session with the Freddy Martin Orchestra, playing "Over the Rainbow" in an arrangement by Ray Conniff, with vocals by Merv Griffin.  Morgan attended Jefferson High School during the day, where he played in the school big band that also spawned jazz greats Art Farmer, Ed Thigpen, Chico Hamilton, Sonny Criss, and Dexter Gordon.  Morgan stayed in contact with Parker during these years, finding himself in jam sessions at Hollywood celebrities' homes when Parker visited L.A.  In 1952, Morgan earned a spot in Lionel Hampton's band, but his first arrest in 1953 prevented him from joining the Clifford Brown and Max Roach quintet (that role went instead to Harold Land, and later, Sonny Rollins).  He made his recording debut on February 20, 1953, with Teddy Charles and his West Coasters in a session for Prestige Records.  This sextet featured short-lived tenor player Wardell Gray and was included on the 1983 posthumous release Wardell Gray Memorial Volume 1. On November 1, 1954, Morgan cut five tracks with the Kenny Clarke Sextet for Savoy Records, four of which were released with Clarke billed as the leader, with "I've Lost Your Love" credited to writer Milt Jackson as leader.  Morgan recorded an all-star date with Wild Bill Davis and Conte Candoli on January 29, 1955 and participated in a second recording session on March 31, 1955, with Candoli, Wardell Gray, Leroy Vinnegar and others, which were combined and released in 1955 as Morgan's first album, Frank Morgan, by GNP Crescendo Records.  Later releases also included five tracks cut at the Crescendo Club in West Hollywood on August 11, 1956, with a sextet featuring Bobby Timmons and Jack Sheldon.  The album copy hailed Morgan as the new Charlie Parker, who had died the same year.  In his own words, Morgan was "scared to death" by this and "self-destructed".

Addiction and incarceration (1955–1985)
Following in the footsteps of Parker, Morgan had started taking heroin at 17, subsequently became addicted, and spent much of his adult life in and out of prison.  Morgan supported his drug habit through check forgery and fencing stolen property.  His first drug arrest came in 1955, the same year his debut album was released, and Morgan landed in San Quentin State Prison in 1962, where he formed a small ensemble with another addict and sax player, Art Pepper.  His final incarceration, for which Morgan had turned himself in on a parole violation, ended on December 7, 1986.  Though he stayed off heroin for the last two decades of his life, Morgan took methadone daily.

Comeback (1985–2007)
Fresh out of prison in April, 1985, Morgan started recording again, releasing Easy Living on Contemporary Records that June.  Morgan performed at the Monterey Jazz Festival on September 21, 1986, and turned down an offer to play Charlie Parker in Clint Eastwood's film Bird (Forest Whitaker took his place).  He made his New York debut in December 1986 at the Village Vanguard, and collaborated with George W.S. Trow on Prison-Made Tuxedos, a semi-autobiographical Off-Broadway play which included live music by the Frank Morgan Quartet (featuring Ronnie Mathews, Walter Booker, and Victor Lewis).  His 1990 album Mood Indigo went to number four on the Billboard jazz chart.  Morgan suffered a stroke in 1998, but subsequently recovered, recording and performing during the last four years of his life.   HighNote Records eventually released three albums worth of material from a three-night stand at the Jazz Standard in New York City in November, 2003.  Morgan also participated in the 2004 Charlie Parker Jazz Festival in Tompkins Square Park.

After moving to Minneapolis in the fall of 2005, Morgan headlined the 2006 Twin Cities Hot Summer Jazz Festival and played duets with Ronnie Mathews at the Dakota Jazz Club in Minneapolis and George Cables at the Artists' Quarter in St. Paul.  Morgan also performed at the 2006 East Coast Jazz Festival in Washington, D.C., and on the West Coast at Yoshi's and Catalina's.  His last gig in Minneapolis featured Grace Kelly, Irv Williams, and Peter Schimke at the Dakota on July 1, 2007.

For one of Morgan's final recordings, he composed and recorded music for the audiobook adaptation of Michael Connelly's crime novel The Overlook (2007), providing brief unaccompanied sax solos at the beginning and end of the book, and between chapters. Morgan is mentioned in the book by lead character Harry Bosch, a jazz enthusiast.

Shortly before his death, Morgan completed his first tour of Europe.

Death
Frank Morgan died in Minneapolis on Friday, December 14, 2007, from complications due to colorectal cancer, nine days before his 74th birthday.  A memorial service featuring members of Morgan's family and a performance by Irv Williams was held at the Artists' Quarter on Sunday, December 23.

Legacy
The New York Times editor Peter Keepnews wrote that Frank Morgan was "a leading figure in the jazz revival of the late '80s, a living reminder of bebop’s durability".  Writing in JazzTimes, David Franklin described Morgan as having a "sweet, singing tone" and praised his "subtle use of dynamic contrast" and "mature self-assuredness" which complemented his "youthful exuberance". The Penguin Guide to Jazz on CD called Morgan "a passionate improviser" who "organizes his solos in a songful, highly logical way".  Comparing Morgan and Art Pepper, C. Michael Bailey wrote that "both possessed a beautifully spearmint-dry ice tone in their early careers and both were unsurpassed as ballad interpreters," and that Morgan showed "why bop still matters so much".  Author Michael Connelly co-produced a documentary film about Morgan, Sound of Redemption: The Frank Morgan Story, directed by N.C. Heikin, which had its world premiere at the Los Angeles Film Festival on June 14, 2014, and was followed the next day by a tribute concert at The Grammy Museum, featuring George Cables, Ron Carter, Mark Gross, Grace Kelly, and Roy McCurdy.

Discography

As leader
 Frank Morgan (Gene Norman Presents, 1955) 
 Easy Living (Contemporary, 1985) 
 Lament (Contemporary, 1986)
 Double Image (Contemporary, 1986) 
 Bebop Lives! (Contemporary, 1986) 
 Major Changes (Contemporary, 1987) 
 Yardbird Suite (Contemporary, 1988) 
 Reflections (Contemporary, 1989) 
 Mood Indigo (Antilles, 1989) 
 A Lovesome Thing (Antilles, 1990) 
 Quiet Fire (Contemporary, 1987 [1991]) with Bud Shank
 You Must Believe in Spring (Antilles, 1992) 
 Listen to the Dawn (Antilles, 1993) 
 Love, Lost & Found (Telarc, 1995)
 Bop! (Telarc, 1996) 
 City Nights: Live at the Jazz Standard (HighNote, 2004) 
 Raising the Standard (HighNote, 2003 [2005])
 Reflections (HighNote, 2006) 
A Night in the Life (HighNote, 2003 [2007])
Twogether (HighNote, 2005 [2010]) with John Hicks
Montreal Memories (HighNote, 1989 [2018]) with George Cables

As sideman
With Teddy Charles
Adventures in California (Fresh Sound Records, 1953)
With Kenny Clarke
Telefunken Blues (Savoy, 1955)
With Art Farmer
Central Avenue Reunion (Contemporary, 1990)
With Terry Gibbs
The Latin Connection (Contemporary, 1986)
With Wardell Gray
Wardell Gray Memorial, Vol. 1 (Prestige, 1983) recorded in 1953
With Milt Jackson
Meet Milt Jackson (Savoy, 1954)
With Abbey Lincoln
Who Used to Dance (Verve, 1996)
With Lyle Murphy
Four Saxophones in Twelve Tones (GNP/Crescendo, 1955)
With Mark Murphy
Night Mood (Milestone, 1986)
With Ben Sidran
Mr. P's Shuffle (Go Jazz, 1996)
With L. Subramaniam
Fantasy without Limits (Trend, 1979)
Conversations (Milestone, 1984)

References

External links

1933 births
2007 deaths
American jazz saxophonists
American male saxophonists
Musicians from Minneapolis
Contemporary Records artists
Verve Records artists
Telarc Records artists
Savoy Records artists
HighNote Records artists
Antilles Records artists
GNP Records artists
20th-century American saxophonists
African-American jazz musicians
Jazz musicians from Minnesota
20th-century American male musicians
American male jazz musicians
Jefferson High School (Los Angeles) alumni
20th-century African-American musicians
21st-century African-American people